The 2013 Web.com Tour was the 24th season of the top developmental tour for the U.S. PGA Tour in men's golf, and the second under the current sponsored name of Web.com Tour. It ran from February 21 to September 29. The season consisted of 25 official money golf tournaments; five of which were played outside of the United States.

This season saw the introduction of the Web.com Tour Finals, the final four events of the season which determined 25 of the 50 players to receive their 2014 PGA Tour cards. The remaining 25 PGA Tour cards went to the top 25 money winners on the Web.com Tour heading into the Tour Finals. For all 50 players who earn PGA Tour cards, their priority position for tournament entry purposes will be based on money earned during the Tour Finals.

Schedule
The following table lists official events during the 2013 season.

Location of tournaments

Money leaders
For full rankings, see 2013 Web.com Tour Finals graduates.

Regular season money leaders
The regular season money list was based on prize money won during the season, calculated in U.S. dollars. The top 25 players on the tour earned status to play on the 2013–14 PGA Tour.

Finals money leaders
A further 25 players earned status to play on the 2013–14 PGA Tour, via the Web.com Tour Finals.

Awards

See also
 2013 Web.com Tour Finals graduates

Notes

References

External links
Official schedule

Korn Ferry Tour seasons
Web.com Tour